The second series of Survivor, commonly referred to as Survivor: Panama, premiered on 13 March 2002 and ran until 29 May 2002. The series was presented by cricket presenter Mark Nicholas and consisted of 37 days of gameplay, with 12 castaways competing for a prize of £1,000,000. Ky was set in the Bocas del Toro archipelago of Panama.

The 12 contestants were initially separated into two tribes, named North Island and South Island. On Day 17, the eight remaining players merged into one tribe, Columbus, named after explorer Christopher Columbus. The six players voted off from Columbus formed the jury, who along with the British public - as the 7th juror - decided who would be the "Ultimate Survivor". After 37 days of competition, police detective Jonny Gibb was named the "Ultimate Survivor", defeating teacher Susannah Moffatt in a 7-0 jury vote. Moffatt complained the show portrayed her as an "arty farty teacher with a posh accent".

Production
Despite the lack of success the first series experienced, ITV decided to renew Survivor for a second series, but with an overhaul. These changes included fewer contestants, audience participation and replacing presenters Mark Austin and John Leslie, with a single presenter, Channel 4 cricket presenter Mark Nicholas.

The series was broadcast weekly on Wednesday nights at 9:45pm and episodes were repeated on Fridays at 8:30pm. The second series was also accompanied by Survivor: The Last Word, a televised interview with evictees, as well as a supporting series, Survivor: Raw, broadcast on sister channel ITV2. Survivor: Raw was presented by "Ultimate Survivor" of Survivor: Pulau Tiga Charlotte Hobrough, as well as Ed Hall. It included extra footage not aired on the main series, discussions, interviews with evictees and phone-ins and emails from viewers.

Contestants

Series details

Voting history

Notes

References

2002 British television seasons
United Kingdom
Television shows filmed in Panama
Television shows set in Central America